The Lancashire and Yorkshire Railway (L&YR) Barton Wright 0-6-2T were tank engines introduced by Barton Wright between 1877 and 1883. This was the first use of the  type in Britain.

Design and construction
Locomotive superintendent William Barton Wright began by rebuilding a Jenkins  tank with  wheels in 1877 with side tanks and a trailing Webb radial axle, this being the first example of this type in the Britain.  Further conversions ensued and a total of 18 were rebuilt by 1883.  Ten new locomotives, the first taking the number 141, were ordered from Kitson in 1880 with  driving wheels for freight traffic, these between designed to share components such as boilers, wheels, cylinders and motion as the existing 1876  engines.  14 of passenger variant of the design were supplied by Kitson in 1881 having  driving wheels and a  longer total wheelbase.  A further 40 were delivered from Dübs & Company between 1882 and 1883.

He dismisses the idea the design improves the curving properties of the locomotive, said this only applies when running bunker first. When running chimney first additional force is placed on the leading outward wheel flange. He notes that on routes with severe curves there have been cases where the  types have had to be replaced with locomotives with a  arrangement.

Service
They were as being described as "probably the most useful type on the LYR in their day". Most were withdrawn in the early 1900s with a few lasting into LMS service in the late 1920s and early 1930s. One of the goods engines, No. 146 was fitted with a crane in 1924 and survived until 1931. About twenty of the passenger variety lasted into LMS service, with four surviving until 1932, and No. 247 with motion removed serving as a carriage warmer until the mid-1960s.

Notes

References

Bibliography and further reading
 
 
 

0-6-2T locomotives
Lancashire and Yorkshire Railway locomotives
Railway locomotives introduced in 1879
Standard gauge steam locomotives of Great Britain
Scrapped locomotives